The Whole World's Goin' Crazy is the fifth studio album by Canadian rock band April Wine, released in September 1976. With the release of this album Steve Lang had replaced Jim Clench on bass. It reached #1 in Canada on the RPM national album chart on May 8, 1976, and remained there for two weeks. The album was the first in Canadian history to have platinum advanced sales orders.

Track listing
All tracks written by Myles Goodwyn unless otherwise noted.

Canadian release
 "Gimme Love" (M. Goodwyn, Hovaness "Johnny" Hagopian) – 4:00
 "So Bad" – 3:26
 "Wings of Love" – 4:51
 "We Can be More than We Are" (M. Goodwyn, J. Henman) - 3:29
 "Rock n' Roll Woman" – 3:44
 "Shotdown" – 3:39
 "Like a Lover, Like a Song" – 6:29 (original release only - subsequent reissues edited out the extended guitar solo reducing the time to 5:12)
 "Kick Willy Road" – 3:22
 "The Whole World's Goin' Crazy" – 2:40

U.S. release
 "Gimme Love" (M. Goodwyn, Hovaness "Johnny" Hagopian)
 "Child's Garden"
 "Rock n' Roll Woman"
 "Wings of Love"
 "Marjorie"
 "So Bad"
 "Shotdown"
 "Like a Lover, Like a Song"
 "Kick Willy Road"
 "The Whole World's Goin' Crazy"

Personnel

April Wine 
 Myles Goodwyn – lead vocals, guitars, piano, Moog synthesizer
 Gary Moffet – guitars, backing vocals
 Jerry Mercer – drums, backing vocals
 Steve Lang – bass, backing vocals

Additional personnel 
Frank Marino – guitar on "So Bad"
Marie Bernard –	Ondes Martenot on "Wings Of Love"
Marie-Lou Gauthier – Background Vocals on "Wings Of Love"
Serge Locas – Mellotron, Piano
Dwayne Ford – Piano
Frank Ludwig – Piano

Charts

Weekly charts

Year-end charts

Certifications and sales

Allusions

The reference to "everybody's nose" in the title track echoes the "everybody's nose" lyric in the 1973 hit song "Bad, Bad Leroy Brown" by Jim Croce.

References

April Wine albums
1976 albums
Aquarius Records (Canada) albums
London Records albums
Albums produced by Myles Goodwyn